Schädlich is a German surname. Notable people with the surname include:

Georg Martin Schädlich, German soldier of the Wehrmacht during World War II
Gerd Schädlich (born 1952), German footballer and manager
Susanne Schädlich (born 1965), German writer and literary translator

German-language surnames